Hypaeus terraemediae is a species of jumping spider from the Brazilian Amazon, specifically São Félix do Xingu, Pará.

References

Salticidae
Spiders of Brazil
Spiders described in 2015